The women's 100 metres event at the 2015 European Athletics U23 Championships was held in Tallinn, Estonia, at Kadriorg Stadium on 9 and 10 July.

Medalists

Results

Final
10 July
Wind: -0.2 m/s

Heats
9 July

Heat 1
Wind: -1.8 m/s

Heat 2
Wind: 0.6 m/s

Heat 3
Wind: -0.4 m/s

Participation
According to an unofficial count, 23 athletes from 17 countries participated in the event.

References

100 metres
100 metres at the European Athletics U23 Championships